Mitchell Jay "Mitch" Booth (born 4 January 1963, in Sydney) is a sailor from Australia, who represented his native country for the first time at the 1992 Summer Olympics in Barcelona. Booth as helmsman in the Australian Tornado with John Forbes as crew took Bronze. In 1996,  Booth made a second appearance this time with crew member Andrew Landenberger the team took the Silver in the Tornado. In 2004, Athens Booth represented the Netherlands as helmsman of the Dutch Tornado. With crew member Herbert Dercksen Booth took 5th place. His final Olympic appearance came during the 2008 Summer Olympics in Qingdao. Now with crew member Pim Nieuwenhuis in the Dutch Tornado, Booth finished 5th.

Sailing career
Booth started his sailing career at the age of four, when his mother taught him the basics on Pittwater. Alongside his father John (Jay) Booth won his first State Championship as a seven-year-old boy. His father honored his desire to skipper and compete in international competitions.   His first break-through came at the age of seventeen, when finishing second in an Australian Championship. This achievement guaranteed his participation at the World Championship in the United States. From a fleet of over hundred boats representing nine countries, he and his crew went on to win the title. Since then Booth has made his life as a professional sailor. The projects have varied from Olympic sailing to Ocean racing and to keel boat racing. Off the water he has been involved in many sailing related activities including the creation of the current Olympic Tornado Class Rig, design and build of A Class cats, the creation of Volvo Extreme 40, sailing Manager for America's cup team (1995) and technical adviser to ISAF.

In total he took part in 64 World Championships, becoming World Champion a total of ten times. In the 50 national championships in which he took part he took the title a total of 13 times. He has won 23 out of 47 Australian State Championships in which he performed. He won eight European titles since becoming Dutch in sixteen starts. He took part in four Olympics.  In 2000 Sydney he was coach of the Australian national team squad.

Awards and records
He has been named the 1992 Australian Yachtsman of the Year, the 1993 Caltex Sports Star finalist, three times NSW Yachtsman of the Year, the 1995 America's Cup sailing manager, the 1996 MMI Sports Star finalist, the 1996 Australian Yachtsman of the Year and the 2004 Dutch Sailor of the year. He was also crew member of the boats holding the previous World 24-hour distance record and Transatlantic (Cadiz to San Salvador) record holder (ClubMed) and the current Round Britain and Ireland record (PlayStation (yacht)).

References

External links 
 
 
 
 

 
 
 
 
 
 
 

1963 births
Living people
Australian male sailors (sport)
Dutch male sailors (sport)
Sailors at the 1992 Summer Olympics – Tornado
Sailors at the 1996 Summer Olympics – Tornado
Sailors at the 2004 Summer Olympics – Tornado
Sailors at the 2008 Summer Olympics – Tornado
Olympic sailors of Australia
Olympic sailors of the Netherlands
Olympic silver medalists for Australia
Olympic bronze medalists for Australia
Olympic medalists in sailing
China Team sailors
Extreme Sailing Series sailors
Sailors from Sydney
Medalists at the 1996 Summer Olympics
Medalists at the 1992 Summer Olympics
Tornado class world champions
World champions in sailing for Australia